Memramcook-Tantramar is a provincial electoral district for the Legislative Assembly of New Brunswick, Canada.

It was created in the 1973 electoral redistribution and first used in the 1974 election as Tantramar.  It went largely unchanged in both the 1994 redistribution and 2006 redistribution, even though it was well below the allowable population variance in the latter.  In 2006, the electoral boundaries commission ruled that the district was an exceptional case, as it was surrounded by water and the province of Nova Scotia to the south and west, and to predominantly francophone areas to the north and east that would become significant minorities were they added to the district.  The 2013 boundaries commission refused to persist the exception and added the francophone village of Memramcook from the former riding of Memramcook-Lakeville-Dieppe to the district.  This change is the subject of a constitutional challenge by francophone activists.

This was the first seat to elect a New Democrat to the legislature, in 1982.

Members of the Legislative Assembly

Election results

Memramcook-Tantramar

|-

|-

|-

Tantramar

External links 
Website of the Legislative Assembly of New Brunswick

References 

New Brunswick provincial electoral districts